Julia Glushko (or Yulia, ; born 1 January 1990) is an Israeli retired tennis player.

She won 11 singles and 14 doubles titles on the ITF Circuit. Her best results at a Grand Slam tournament were reaching the third round of the US Open in 2013, and the French Open in 2014 in singles. In September 2015, she reached the final of the WTA Challenger event in Dalian, where she was defeated by Zheng Saisai.

On 23 June 2014, Glushko reached her best singles ranking of world No. 79. On 4 November 2013, she peaked at No. 109 in the doubles rankings. She won the 2011 Israeli National Women's Singles Championship. Playing for Israel in the Fed Cup, she had a win–loss record of 29–29.

Early and personal life
Glushko was born in Donetsk, Ukrainian SSR, USSR, who is fluent in Hebrew, Russian, and English. She started playing tennis at the age of four. Her parents, Sergio and Olga, are tennis instructors. Glushko and her family immigrated to Israel from Ukraine when she was nine years old, initially living in the Katamon neighborhood of the city of Jerusalem for three years, and then in the city of Ramat HaSharon. She then trained at the Wingate Institute in Netanya. She served in the Israel Defense Forces for over two years. She lives in Modi'in, halfway between Jerusalem and Tel Aviv, Israel. Her younger sister Lina Glushko is also a tennis player.

Tennis career

Junior years
Glushko won four junior titles. The first three were the 2006 Saadia Rees (Grade 4), the 2007 Argentina Cup (Grade 2), and the 2007 Uruguay Bowl (Grade 2).

In March 2007, she won the Grade-1 Asunción Bowl junior girls tournament in Paraguay. It was the first Grade-1 title of Glushko's career.  At 17 years of age she was ranked 10th in the world junior tennis rankings.

At the US Open in September 2007, Glushko won her first two junior singles matches, and her first-round junior doubles match with Tyra Calderwood.

Professional career

Glushko won 11 singles and 14 doubles titles on the ITF Women's Circuit. Her best results at a Grand Slam tournament was reaching the third round of the US Open in 2013, and the French Open in 2014 in singles.

Glushko made her professional debut in March 2004 at an ITF event in Ramat HaSharon. She beat Diana Voskoboynik (Israel) in the first round of qualifying, before losing to Yakaterina Burduli.

Her best result on the professional level to that point was a semifinal appearance at an ITF event in Antalya in May 2006, where Glushko lost to Çağla Büyükakçay.

In November 2007, Glushko won her first ITF title an event in Mallorca, beating Diana Enache in the final.

In 2008, she won three ITF titles in doubles competitions with different partners. Glushko celebrated her maiden title at Albufeira, Portugal, alongside Marina Melnikova in February, beating Martina Babáková and Elena Chalova in the final, followed by the victory at Porto Rafti, Greece, with Dominice Ripoll in March, and a third tournament win in May at Ra'anana, where Glushko teamed up with Manana Shapakidze.

In November 2010, she defeated top-seeded world No. 42, Jarmila Wolfe, at the $25k event in Traralgon, Australia, which she won.

In December 2010, Glushko lost the final of the Israeli championships to Shahar Pe'er, in three sets.

In January 2011, she played her first Grand Slam qualifying match, for the Australian Open , reaching the second round after losing to Nuria Llagostera Vives.

Glushko beat Shahar Pe'er in the women's final of the 2011 Israel National Championships.

In 2012, Glushko made her Grand Slam main-draw debut at the US Open, after she defeated Zheng Saisai in the qualifying competition. She lost in the first round to Yanina Wickmayer in straight sets.

In May 2013, Glushko played her second Grand Slam event, the French Open, after she defeated Anastasia Rodionova from Australia in the qualifying competition. Again, she lost in the first round, this time to María Teresa Torró Flor.

In August 2013, Glushko played in Rogers Cup qualifying and defeated Christina McHale in the first round. In the second round of qualifying, she defeated Gabriela Dabrowski in straight sets and entered her first Premier tournament. She played at the 2013 US Open and, after qualifying to the main draw, beat 20th-seeded world No. 23, Nadia Petrova. In the second round, she defeated Sachia Vickery, but lost to Daniela Hantuchová in a third-set tiebreaker in round three.

In September 2013, Glushko won her first WTA Tour main-draw match defeating Tetyana Arefyeva. In the second round, she lost to Galina Voskoboeva.

In May 2014, she lost in the first round of Nürnberger Versicherungscup to Caroline Garcia, after qualifying to the main draw. Glushko played at the French Open and beat Donna Vekić in the first round. In the second round, she defeated world No. 22, Kirsten Flipkens, in three sets. However, her run came to an end when she was beaten by Sara Errani, winning only one game.

In June 2014, Glushko lost in the first round of Wimbledon to Sabine Lisicki, 2–6, 1–6 on the Centre Court. In September 2015, she reached the final of the 2015 WTA 125K series event in Dalian, where she was defeated by Zheng Saisai.

In August 2014, she defeated world No. 32, Bojana Jovanovski, at the Western & Southern Open in Cincinnati.

In 2017, the Women’s Tennis Association deleted reference to Glushko's nationality and Israel's flag from her profile on their website ahead of her scheduled participation at the Malaysian Open in Kuala Lumpur, when event organizers requested all references to her being Israeli be removed from the WTA website in order for her to be allowed to take part in the event. The WTA subsequently reinstated them. 

On 29 July 2018, she won the $60k singles title at the ITF tournament in Granby, Canada, defeating top-seeded Arina Rodionova of Australia in the final.

At the 2018 US Open, Glushko hurt her left knee during play, but had it taped and won her match against Monica Niculescu. She then lost to Naomi Osaka as she played taped calf to quad and hobbled, and learned, however, that she had a fracture in her left knee, and once it healed she had surgery to clean the meniscus. 

She played her final professional tournament in Israel in September 2019, when she lost in the first round singles, and quarterfinals with doubles partner, sister Lina Glushko. On 24 December 2019, she retired from competitive tennis at 29 years of age.

Fed Cup
Playing for Israel in the Fed Cup, Glushko's record was 29-29. 

Glushko made her debut with the Israel Fed Cup team on 22 April 2007, in Kamloops, Canada. She lost in straight sets to Marie-Ève Pelletier, after Israel had already clinched the match 3–2. In July, she played Melanie Klaffner in another dead rubber, with Israel defeating Austria 4–1.

At the 2011 Fed Cup held in Eilat, Glushko won three out of her four singles rubbers – against Anne Kremer of Luxembourg, Magda Linette of Poland, and Elitsa Kostova of Bulgaria; she lost to Monica Niculescu of Romania. Glushko also won two out of three doubles matches together with Shahar Pe'er – against Luxembourg and Romania. Israel lost to Poland.

At the 2012 Fed Cup, she won one out of her three singles rubbers, and she won one out of her two doubles games with Shahar Pe'er. She defeated Maria João Koehler and lost to Bibiane Schoofs and Anne Keothavong. In doubles, she and Pe'er lost to Koehler and Michelle Larcher de Brito from Portugal, but defeated Schoofs and Michaëlla Krajicek from the Netherlands.

At the 2013 Fed Cup, Glushko won all four of her singles rubbers, but won neither of her two doubles games with Pe'er.

Maccabiah Games
Competing at the 2005 Maccabiah Games, Glushko lost to Sharon Fichman of Canada in the semifinals.

WTA 125K series finals

Singles: 1 (runner–up)

Doubles: 2 (2 runner–ups)

ITF Circuit finals

Singles: 15 (11 titles, 4 runner–ups)

Doubles: 32 (14–18)

Grand Slam singles performance timeline

See also
 List of select Jewish tennis players

References

External links

 
 
 
 
 "Glushko reflects on tennis, Israel and her experience on the WTA Tour," The Jerusalem Post, August 29, 2018

1990 births
Living people
People from Bakhmut
Israeli female tennis players
Ukrainian emigrants to Israel
Maccabiah Games tennis players
Maccabiah Games competitors for Israel
Competitors at the 2005 Maccabiah Games
Israeli people of Ukrainian descent
Israeli people of Soviet descent